Lee Wilkof (born June 25, 1951) is an American actor and veteran of the Broadway stage. He originated the roles of Samuel Byck in Assassins and Seymour in Little Shop of Horrors, later earning a Tony Award nomination for the 2000 revival of Kiss Me, Kate.

Biography

Early life
Wilkof is from Canton, Ohio. He is the middle child of Anne Louise and Darwin Wilkof. He has two brothers, Todd and Robert. He graduated from the University of Cincinnati in 1972 and studied acting with Austin Pendleton in New York City.

Career
After graduating from UC, Wilkof co-wrote and performed in a comedy revue called The Present Tense in 1977 at the Park Royal Theatre in New York City. Shortly after its closing Wilkof moved to Los Angeles and took small film and television roles. His big break came in 1982 with the leading role as Seymour in the original Off-Broadway production of Little Shop of Horrors."

Wilkof has appeared in numerous television series, and films. He directed the film No Pay, Nudity with a cast that stars Nathan Lane, Gabriel Byrne, and Frances Conroy.

He plays the banjo and sings in the musical quartet Twenty Mule Team Weiner Train. He is the winner of the New Yorker Cartoon Caption Contest # 217.

Personal life
Wilkof lives in Gardiner, New York with his wife, painter Connie Grappo. They have a daughter Perrie who is an acclaimed baker living in Columbus, Ohio.

Theater
Broadway
 Sweet Charity Revival, as Herman, 1986
 The Front Page Revival, as Schwartz, 1986–1987
 She Loves Me Revival, as Ladislav Sipos, 1993–1994
 Kiss Me, Kate Revival, as First Man (singing Brush Up Your Shakespeare), 1999-2001
 The Boys from Syracuse Revival, as Dromio of Syracuse, 2002
 Democracy, as Gunther Nollau, 2004–2005
 The Odd Couple Revival, as Vinnie, 2005–2006
 Breakfast at Tiffany's, as OJ Berman, 2013
 Holiday Inn, as Danny, 2016
 Waitress, as Joe, 2018

Off-Broadway, Regional and Tour
 The Present Tense, 1977
 Little Shop of Horrors, as Seymour, 1982
 Angry Housewives, as Lewd, 1986
 Assassins, as Samuel Byck, 1990
 Do Re Mi, (Encores! Concert), as Fatso O'Rear, 1999
 Little Shop of Horrors, Broadway Florida tryout, as Mr. Mushnik, 2003
 Ballad of Little Pinks at the New York Musical Theatre Festival, 2003
 Face The Music, Encores! Concert, as Martin Van Meshbesher, 2007
 Wicked First National Tour, as The Wizard (2007–2008)
 Wicked San Francisco production, as The Wizard (2009–2010)
 The Iceman Cometh,  The Goodman Theatre, as Hugo Kalmar 2012
 The Iceman Cometh  Brooklyn Academy of Music as Hugo Kalmar 2015

Select filmography
 Serial  (1980)
 Wholly Moses! (1980)
 The Entity (1981)
 Perry Mason: The Case of the Shooting Star (1986)
 Kill Me Again (1989)
 Chattahoochee (1989)
 This Boy's Life (1993) - Principal Shippy
 The Associate (1996)
 Private Parts (1997)
 The Grey Zone (2001)
 School of Rock (2003)
 Imaginary Heroes (2004)
 Mojave Phone Booth (2006)
 Before the Devil Knows You're Dead (2007)
 Love Comes Lately (2007)
 Leaves of Grass (2009) - Professor Levy
 YellowBrickRoad (2010)
 Anesthesia (2015) - Ray

Selected television
 Disco Beaver from Outer Space (1978)
 W.E.B. as Harvey Pearlstein (1978)
 Delta House as Einswine (1979)
 Hart to Hart as Stanley Friesen (1979-1982)
 Matlock Episode: "The Reporter" as Dr. Randolph (1987)
 Max Headroom as Edwards (1987–88)
 100 Centre Street as Alexander Weiss (2001)
 Ally McBeal as District Attorney Nixon (1998–2002)
 Law & Order franchise as various characters (1991–2019)

Awards and nominations
 Obie Award for The Present Tense
Drama Desk Award nomination for The Present Tense Drama Desk nomination for Assassins Tony nomination for Kiss Me, Kate Drama Desk nomination for Kiss Me, Kate''

References

External links
 
 
 
 Broadway World Biography

1951 births
Living people
American male singers
American male film actors
American male musical theatre actors
American male television actors
Musicians from Canton, Ohio
Male actors from Ohio
Singers from Ohio
Actors from Canton, Ohio
University of Cincinnati – College-Conservatory of Music alumni